Exiting Arm (stylized as ExitingARM) is the third studio album by American hip hop sextet Subtle. It was released on Lex Records in 2008. It is "the latest chapter in the story of Hour Hero Yes, the middle-class rapper whose rise and struggles are chronicled told on 2004's A New White and 2006's For Hero: For Fool."

Critical reception
At Metacritic, which assigns a weighted average score out of 100 to reviews from mainstream critics, the album received an average score of 75% based on 14 reviews, indicating "generally favorable reviews".

Christopher Bahn of The A.V. Club gave the album a grade of B, writing, "Musically, ExitingARM is just as layered, blenderizing beats, sampled electronic noise, and Doseone's easygoing, flowing words into a package that's sometimes electrifying and sometimes confounding." Eric Grandy of The Stranger said, "Throughout ExitingARM, frontman Doseone remains an inscrutable MC, quick-tongued and verbose, and an unassuming but surprisingly fluid singer, whispering melodies in multitracked reverb to contrast his sharper falsetto raps."

Pitchfork included it on the "Overlooked Records 2008" list.

Track listing

Personnel
Credits adapted from liner notes.

Subtle
 Dax Pierson – vocals, Ableton Live (synthesizer, programming)
 Alexander Kort – electric cello, acoustic cello, electric bass, acoustic bass
 Jordan Dalrymple – drums, guitar, synthesizer, vocals, programming
 Jeffrey "Jel" Logan – drum machine, drum programming
 Marty Kalani Dowers – woodwinds, synthesizer
 Adam "Doseone" Drucker – words, vocals, synthesizer, programming, artwork

Technical personnel
 Subtle – recording
 Jay Pellicci – mixing
 Mike Wells – mastering

References

External links
 

2008 albums
Subtle (band) albums
Lex Records albums